Sangmu Baseball Stadium is a name of two baseball stadiums in South Korea, both used by the KBO Futures League team Sangmu Phoenix. The stadiums are operated by the Korea Armed Forces Athletic Corps.

Seongnam Sangmu Baseball Stadium
Seongnam Sangmu Baseball Stadium is located in Seongnam, Gyeonggi Province and was built in 1990. The venue was used by the Sangmu Phoenix until 2012.

Mungyeong Sangmu Baseball Stadium
Mungyeong Sangmu Baseball Stadium is located in Mungyeong, North Gyeongsang Province and was built in 2013. It is the home ground of the Sangmu Phoenix since 2013.

References 

Baseball venues in South Korea
Seongnam
Korea Armed Forces Athletic Corps
Sports venues in Gyeonggi Province
Sports venues completed in 1990
Sports venues completed in 2013